Silas Dinsmoor (September 26, 1766 – June 17, 1847) was an appointed U. S. Agent to the Cherokee (1794–1798) and to the Choctaw (1801–1813).  He later served as a surveyor in Alabama before eventually retiring to Boone County, Kentucky, where he is buried at the Dinsmore Homestead.

Early life 
Born in Windham, New Hampshire, Silas Dinsmore was of Scots-Irish descent and was part of a large group of inter-related families who settled in southern New Hampshire in the early 1700s. Through his mother, Martha McKeen, he was related to Joseph McKeen, the first president of Bowdoin College in Maine.  He was also a first cousin of Pennsylvania Governor Thomas McKean, a signer of the Declaration of Independence.  Silas worked his way through Dartmouth College by teaching, a profession he continued to practice after his graduation.  At nearby Atkinson Academy he taught a newly formed co-educational class of students, opening up the chance for young ladies to learn Logic, Greek, and Rhetoric - topics normally reserved for male students.

As agent to the Indians 
In 1793, Silas traveled to Philadelphia to look for a position with the government.  He was offered the appointment of United States Agent to the Cherokee by President George Washington, a job that would last the next four years. In that capacity, Dinsmoor was expected to keep peace between the Native Americans and white settlers, serve as treaty commissioner, and introduce "civilization" to the Indians. This last task meant that he was to attempt to coax the males of the tribe to take up farming which was traditionally the occupation of females, and to teach the women to plant cotton, spin, and weave textiles. He spent much of his time at Tellico Blockhouse (in present-day Tennessee).  As the agent, Dinsmoor was a witness to the First Treaty of Tellico, signed in 1798 between the U. S. Government and tribal leaders, which signed away land in eastern Tennessee.  At the time, Silas wrote to his brother, "the Cherokees know the worth of their land too well to sell it for a song or anything under the value."

In 1798, when his term expired, Dinsmoor again went to Philadelphia in hopes of another post. Instead, in 1799 he accepted the job of purser on the naval frigate, USS George Washington.  In that capacity he sailed with the ship on a historic mission, it being the first U. S. warship to enter the Mediterranean Sea.  Under the command of William Bainbridge, the frigate was sent to Algiers with trade items and tribute for the Barbary pirates.  When they arrived in Algiers, the Dey ordered the Americans to carry (under the flag of Algiers) an ambassador, several slaves, and exotic animals to Constantinople for the Sultan of Turkey.

Returning to the states, Dinsmoor was appointed by President Thomas Jefferson as Agent to the Choctaw and he proceeded to the small outpost of Washington, Mississippi Territory, located at the southern end of the Natchez Trace.  It was presumed he would carry out a similar set of tasks as before, with the added expectation of encouraging the Choctaw to cede large sections of their land to the government. Again, the Native Americans were less than willing to give up their most valuable lands. The Treaty of Mount Dexter, signed in 1805, which sold away more than four million acres of Choctaw land in southeastern Mississippi and parts of Alabama, angered President Jefferson because he had wanted the more valuable lands along the Mississippi River.  Dinsmoor also witnessed the Treaty of Fort St. Stephens of 1816 and the Treaty of Doak's Stand of 1820.  By this time, though, he was no longer serving as agent.

In 1811 Dinsmoor found himself embroiled in a controversy with Andrew Jackson and by 1813 he was looking for a new government post.  The controversy began with reports from the Natchez region that slaves were being encouraged to run away by traders from Tennessee.  Dinsmoor was asked to protect the property of the local planters and he began instituting an often ignored requirement that anyone traveling the Natchez Trace carry papers with them proving their ownership of any enslaved people they claimed. Jackson refused to do so and became quite furious when he heard the rule was being vigorously enforced, at one point threatening to arm his slaves on his next time through, kill Dinsmoor, and burn the agency house to the ground. Though he never found the right moment to carry out his threat, his missives to the War Department may have had something to do with Dinsmoor being replaced in 1813.

Dinsmoor was elected a member of the American Antiquarian Society in 1813.

Later life 
Dinsmoor moved with his wife, Mary Gordon, and children to St. Stephens, the capital of the Alabama Territory, and then to Mobile.  He served for a time as Principal Surveyor for the Land Office in New Orleans. Again, he had personal troubles with his superior, George Davis, and was let go. Suffering financially from unpaid wages and a debt he had incurred as security for a friend, he was forced to go to Washington, D. C. in 1826 to plead for money.  While he was away from Mobile, he learned of the death of a son and the burning of the bank where he had stored his valuable surveying journals, business papers, and a silver sword Washington had presented to him during a visit to Mount Vernon in 1798.

In 1829 he moved to Cincinnati, Ohio, and a year later he purchased land in Boone County, Kentucky.  The approximately 100 acre purchase included an orchard, a cabin, and Loughery Island in the Ohio River.  He lived here with his wife and son, Thomas, until his death in 1847.  He was buried in the family graveyard of his nephew, James Dinsmore, which is now part of the Dinsmore Homestead.  The papers he left are housed at Dartmouth.

References

McLoughlin, William G.  Cherokee Renascence in the New Republic.  Princeton:  Princeton University Press, 1986.

The Dinsmore Homestead

Remini, Robert V.  Andrew Jackson and the Course of American Empire, 1767-1821.  New York:  Harper & Row, Publishers, 1977.

Pate, James P. (Editor),  The Reminiscences of George Strother Gaines:  Pioneer and Statesman of Early Alabama and Mississippi, 1805-1843.  Tuscaloosa:  The University of Alabama Press, 1998.

External links
 The Papers of the Dinsmore Family at Dartmouth College Library

1766 births
1847 deaths
People from Windham, New Hampshire
American civil servants
Members of the American Antiquarian Society
Choctaw
United States Indian agents
Surveyors